Ictinogomphus rapax, the common clubtail, is a species of dragonfly in the family Gomphidae. It is found throughout the Indomalayan region.

Description and habitat

It is a large yellow and black colored dragonfly with bluish-grey eyes. The thorax is black, marked with yellow or greenish-yellow stripes. The abdomen is also black with bright yellow marks. There is a leaf-like expansion in both sides of segment 8.

This species usually perches on a bare twig facing the water, commonly found in ponds, tanks and rivers. It breeds in running
and still water.

See also
 List of odonates of India

References

Gomphidae
Taxa named by Jules Pierre Rambur
Insects described in 1842